Kukanapalli, also spelled as Kookanapalli, is a village in the Koppal taluk of Koppal district in the Indian state of Karnataka. Kukanapalli is located Northeast to District Headquarters Koppal. Kukanapalli lies on Mangalore-Solapur National Highway.

Demographics
As of 2001 India census, Kukanapalli had a population of 2,213 with 1,182 males and 1,031 females and 366 Households.

See also
Gangavathi
Indaragi
Kushtagi
Hospet
Koppal

References

External links
 www.koppal.nic.in

Villages in Koppal district